Yassine Idmbarek (born 7 December 1986) is a Moroccan tennis player.

Idmbarek has a career high ATP singles ranking of 659 achieved on 18 January 2016. He also has a career high ATP doubles ranking of 641 achieved on 19 October 2009.

Idmbarek made his ATP main draw debut at the 2012 Grand Prix Hassan II in the singles draw. Idmbarek represents Morocco in the Davis Cup.

References

External links

1986 births
Living people
Moroccan male tennis players
21st-century Moroccan people